Ezra Dagan (born April 2, 1947) is an Israeli actor noted for his acting in the Steven Spielberg film, Schindler's List (1993), where he portrayed the character Rabbi Menasha Lewartow.

Filmography
Dagan also acted in films including Hunting Elephants (2012), The Attack (2012), The Other Son (2012), Mörderischer Besuch (TV movie) (2009), Naamonet (short) (1999), Body in the Sand (1996), The Revolutionary II (video)  (1995), The Revolutionary (video) (1993), Schindler's List (1993), Me'Ahorei Hasoragim II (1986), Yaldei Stalin (1986), America 3000 (1983), Ha-Pachdani (1980), Festival Shirei Yeladim (1975), Nurith (1973), and A Gift from Heaven. In his career as a film artist, he has worked with Emmanuelle Devos (The Other Son), Ralph Fiennes (Schindler's List), Shmuel Shilo (Valdei Stalin) and Dori Ben-Zeev   (Hasereth Festival Hayeladim).

References

1947 births
Living people
21st-century Israeli male actors
20th-century Israeli male actors
Israeli male film actors
Place of birth missing (living people)